Aldershot is a town in Hampshire, England.

Aldershot may also refer to:

Aldershot railway station, a railway station in the English town
Aldershot (UK Parliament constituency)
Aldershot F.C., a football team from the English town; dissolved in 1992
Aldershot Town F.C., the current football team from the English town
 Aldershot, Ontario, an unincorporated community in Canada
 Aldershot GO Station, a station in the GO Transit network located in the community
Aldershot School, a Grade 7-12 school located in the community
 Aldershot, Nova Scotia, Canada
5th Canadian Division Support Base Detachment Aldershot, Canadian Forces base
 Aldershot, Queensland, a town in Australia
, a number of ships with this name

See also
Aldershot Command
Aldershot Garrison also known as Aldershot Military Town, is a major garrison in South East England
Aldershot & District Football League
Aldershot & District Traction